A couch is a piece of furniture.

Couch or couches may also refer to:

Biology 
 Elymus repens, also known as Couch grass
 Cynodon dactylon, also known as Bermuda grass
 Various species of Digitaria

Media

Film and television 
 Couch (film), a 1964 film by Andy Warhol

Music
 Couch (band), a German post-rock band
 "Couch", a song by Eves Karydas from the 2018 album Summerskin

Places 
 Couch, West Virginia, a community in the United States
 Couches, Saône-et-Loire, a commune in the Saône-et-Loire department of France

Other uses 
 Couch (company), an electrical company in Massachusetts, United States
 Couch (surname)
 CouchDB, a distributed document-centric datastore written in Erlang
 Community of Urbana Champaign Cooperative Housing, an American association of housing cooperatives

See also 

 Couch surfing (disambiguation)
 
 
 Coach (disambiguation)
 The Couch (disambiguation)
 Sofa (disambiguation)
 Settee (disambiguation)